Events in the year 2018 in the Northern Mariana Islands.

Incumbents

President: Donald Trump
Governor: Ralph Torres

Events

24 October – The Typhoon Yutu caused catastrophic damage to the islands of Tinian and Saipan, and became the strongest tropical cyclone to ever impact the Mariana Islands.

13 November – 2018 Northern Mariana Islands general election

13 November – The 2018 Northern Mariana Islands gubernatorial election had two candidates, and incumbent Governor Ralph Torres won the election ahead of Juan Babauta.

Deaths

5 March – Tomas Aguon Camacho, Roman Catholic Bishop (b. 1933).

20 March – Ramon Deleon Guerrero, politician (b. 1946)

References

 
2010s in the Northern Mariana Islands
Years of the 21st century in the Northern Mariana Islands
Northern Mariana Islands
Northern Mariana Islands